WJQQ (97.1 FM) is a radio station broadcasting a classic rock format. Licensed to Somerset, Kentucky, United States, the station is currently owned by iHeartMedia, Inc. and features programming from Westwood One.

History
The station went on the air as WSFC-FM on September 1, 1964. In 1966, the station was relaunched as WSEK-FM with a Western and country music format.

In 1981, WSEK-FM switched its network affiliation to the NBC Radio Network after having been with ABC since 1969.

In 1968, the station changed its call sign to WSEK. On August 9, 2005, the station changed its call sign to WKEQ-FM; on August 18, 2005, the station modified its call sign to WKEQ.

On June 1, 2016, changed its call sign to the current WJQQ, strengthening its ties to sister station WKQQ (100.1 FM) in Lexington, Kentucky.

Previous logo
 (WKEQ's logo under previous classic hits format)

References

External links
97.1 Double Q Facebook

JQQ
IHeartMedia radio stations
Radio stations established in 1964
1964 establishments in Kentucky
Classic rock radio stations in the United States
Somerset, Kentucky